Island Command Faroes (ISCOMFAROES) was the military unit on the Faroe Islands. It was the military command of the Faroe Islands, the Faroe Islands airspace and the Faroe Islands territorial waters. It supported the local government with military advice as well as search and rescue capabilities. Island Command Faroes was amalgamated with Island Command Greenland to a Joint Arctic Command on 31 October 2012.

History 
Faroes Marine District was established on 5 September 1951 in Tórshavn.

On 1 June 1961, the district name was changed to the Faroe Islands Command, and on the same date, the Marine Station Thorshavn was created as an authority.

In 1963, the Marine Station at Hoyvíksvegur 58 was built and became the new home of the Faroe Islands Command, which until 1979 consisted of the command authority (Faroe Command), the Marine Station ,and Naval Radio Tórshavn. From amalgamation in 1979 until the establishment of the Arctic Command on 31 October 2012, the Faroe Islands Command was the joint authority name.

On 1 January 2001, the new Level II authority was established, which was called the Faroe Islands Command.

On 2 July 2002, there was a ceremony where the Dannebrog (Danish Flag) was hauled down for the last time at the Marine Station in Tórshavn. The key to the buildings was then handed over to Tórshavn's mayor. The final relocation was a reality and Mjørkadalur became the new home of the Faroe Islands Command.

In 2005, the Danish government decided that all activities on the mountain of Sornfelli should be shut down on 15 November 2010.

The NATO radar installations which had been established in 1963 in Mjørkadalur on the mountain of Sornfelli at 749 metres above sea level, were a link in the defence of the Arctic Circle. The radar installation was closed at a small ceremony on 1 January 2007 after more than 40 years. 

It is permitted for civilians to travel on the mountain road up to the radar facility, which offers a panoramic view of the Faroes. 

Since 10 February 2011 a part of the main building in Mjørkadalur has been used as a detention centre by the Danish Police in the Faroe Islands; this came about due to problems with mould in the former locations of the detention centre. The Danish defence forces handed over the buildings in Mjørkadalur to the Faroese government in 2013.

Commanding officer

Commanders of Island Command Faroes have been:

References

External links
Information in Danish about the Faroese military command

Military units and formations of Denmark
Military units and formations of NATO
Military of the Faroe Islands
Military units and formations established in 1961
Military units and formations disestablished in 2012